Greek European Citizens was a short-time Greek political party, founded by Jorgo Chatzimarkakis. Chatzimarkakis a German politician of Greek descent, Member of the European Parliament with the Free Democratic Party of Germany founded the party to take part in 2014 European Parliament Elections. He had aimed his party to become a "strong voice of Greeks" in European parliament. In election 2014 the party took 82,350 votes or 1.44% of the votes and ranked in 9th place. In early January 2015, the party announced that will cooperate with New Democracy for the upcoming general elections.

Election results

European Parliament

References

External links
Official Webpage

Liberal parties in Greece
Classical liberal parties
Political parties established in 2014
2014 establishments in Greece

Pro-European political parties in Greece